Howard Houston Henry (June 19, 1882February 12, 1919) was an American football player.  He played college football for the Princeton Tigers football team and was selected as a consensus All-American at the halfback position in 1903. Before Princeton, Henry was prepped at Germantown Academy graduating with the class of 1899. On June 23, 1904, he was married to Mae Drexel Fell, the daughter of Mrs. Alexander Van Rensselaer of Philadelphia. They had a daughter, Sarah Drexel Henry, born on March 28, 1905.  During World War I, he served as a captain in the United States Army.  While under the care of Dr. Norris Vaux, he died of heart failure in London, England, on February 12, 1919, at age 36.  In 1924, the Howard Henry Memorial Dormitory at Princeton was dedicated in memory of Henry's wartime service.  A memorial tablet was also unveiled with the following inscription: "The Class of 1904 - Howard Henry Memorial Dormitory, The Gift of the Class of 1904 and of the Friends of Howard Houston Henry, President of the Class, Captain of the United States Army.  Died in the Service of His Country, February 12, 1919."

References

1882 births
1919 deaths
American football ends
All-American college football players
Princeton Tigers football players
United States Army officers
United States Army personnel of World War I
Players of American football from Philadelphia
Germantown Academy alumni